The sixth electoral unit of the Federation of Bosnia and Herzegovina is a parliamentary constituency used to elect members to the House of Representatives of the Federation of Bosnia and Herzegovina since 2000.    Located within Zenica-Doboj Canton, it consists of the municipalities of Breza, Kakanj, Olovo, Visoko, and Vareš.

Demographics

Representatives

References

Constituencies of Bosnia and Herzegovina